Charles Cleveland Convers (July 26, 1810 – September 20, 1860) was a Republican politician in the U.S. State of Ohio who was Speaker of the Ohio Senate for two years and a judge on the Ohio Supreme Court for a short time.

Biography
Charles Cleveland Convers was born at Zanesville, Ohio. He graduated from Ohio University and the Harvard Law School. In 1849, he was elected to the Ohio Senate from Muskingum County, Ohio for the 48th General Assembly, which convened December 3, 1849. In January, 1850, Speaker Harrison G. Blake resigned, and Convers was chosen as his replacement. In 1850, he was re-elected, and again sat as Speaker in the 49th General Assembly.

In 1851, when Ohio Supreme Court seats first became elective, Convers was unsuccessful as a Whig nominee.

Convers was a member of the board of trustees of Ohio University from 1845 to 1849.

In 1854, Convers was elected Judge of the Court of Common Pleas. In 1855, the Republican State Convention nominated him for Judge of the Ohio Supreme Court. He defeated Democrat Robert B. Warden that year. He served only a short time before resigning due to poor health. He died September 20, 1860. Convers helped found Woodlawn Cemetery in Zanesville, where he is buried.

Convers was married to Catherine Buckingham of Zanesville on April 14, 1839. They raised four children.

Notes

References

Ohio state senators
Presidents of the Ohio State Senate
Ohio lawyers
Justices of the Ohio Supreme Court
Ohio Republicans
Politicians from Zanesville, Ohio
Ohio University alumni
1810 births
1860 deaths
Ohio Whigs
19th-century American politicians
Harvard Law School alumni
Ohio University trustees
19th-century American judges
19th-century American lawyers